George Szirtes (born 29 November 1948) is a British poet and translator from the Hungarian language into English. Originally from Hungary, he has lived in the United Kingdom for most of his life after coming to the country as a refugee at the age of eight. Szirtes was a judge for the 2017 Griffin Poetry Prize.

Life
Born in Budapest on 29 November 1948, Szirtes came to England as a refugee in 1956 aged 8. After a few days in an army camp followed by three months in an off-season boarding house on the Kent coast, along with other Hungarian refugees, his family moved to London, where he was brought up and went to school, then studied fine art in London and Leeds. Among his teachers at Leeds was the poet Martin Bell.

His poems began appearing in national magazines in 1973, and his first book, The Slant Door, was published in 1979. It won the Geoffrey Faber Memorial Prize the following year.

He has won a variety of prizes for his work, most recently the 2004 T. S. Eliot Prize, for his collection Reel, and the Bess Hokin Prize in 2008 for poems in Poetry magazine. His translations from Hungarian poetry, fiction and drama have also won numerous awards. He has received an Honorary Fellowhsip from Goldsmiths College, University of London and an Honorary Doctorate from the University of East Anglia. He also won the Poetry and the People Award in Guangzhou, China in 2016. In 2019 he was a contributor to A New Divan: A Lyrical Dialogue between East and West (Gingko Library).

Szirtes lives in Wymondham, Norfolk, having retired from teaching at the University of East Anglia in 2013. He is married to the artist Clarissa Upchurch, with whom he ran The Starwheel Press and who has been responsible for most of his book jacket images.

Prizes and honours
1980 – Faber Memorial Prize for The Slant Door
1982 – Elected Fellow of the Royal Society of Literature
1984 – Arts Council Travelling Scholarship,
1986 – Cholmondeley Prize
1990 – Déry Prize for Translation The Tragedy of Man
1991 – Gold Star of the Hungarian Republic
1992 – Shortlisted for Whitbread Poetry Prize for Bridge Passages
1995 – European Poetry Translation Prize for New Life
1996 – Shortlisted for Aristeion Translation Prize New Life
1999 – Sony Bronze Award, 1999 – for contribution to BBC Radio Three, Danube programmes
1999 – Shortlisted for Weidenfeld Prize for The Adventures of Sindbad
2000 – Shortlisted for Forward Prize Single Poem: Norfolk Fields
2002 – George Cushing Prize for Anglo-Hungarian Cultural Relations
2002 – Society of Authors Travelling Scholarship
2003 – Leverhulme Research Fellowship
2004 – Pro Cultura Hungarica medal
2004 – T. S. Eliot Prize, for Reel
2005 – Shortlisted for Weidenfeld Prize for the Night of Akhenaton
2005 – Shortlisted for Popescu Prize for The Night of Akhenaton
2005 – PEN Translation Fund Grant from PEN American Center
2006 – Ovid Prize, Romania
2008 – Bess Hokin Prize (USA) Poetry Foundation
2009 – Shortlisted for T S Eliot Prize for The Burning of the Books and Other Poems
2013 – CLPE Prize for in the Land if the Giants, poems for children
2013 – Shortlisted for T S Eliot Prize for Bad Machine
2013 – Best Translated Book Award, winner, Satantango
2015 – Man Booker International winner, as translator of László Krasznahorkai
2016 – Poetry and People Prize (China)
2020 – Shortlisted for the PEN/Ackerley Prize for The Photographer at Sixteen Winner James Tait Black Prize for Biography 2020
2020 - Winner of James Tait Black Prize for Biography, for The Photographer at Sixteen

Works

Poetry collections 
Poetry Introduction 4 with Craig Raine, Alan Hollinghurst, Alistair Elliott, Anne Cluysenaar and Cal Clothier (Faber, 1978)
The Slant Door (Secker & Warburg, 1979)
November and May (Secker & Warburg, 1981)
Short Wave (Secker & Warburg, 1984)
The Photographer in Winter (Secker & Warburg, 1986)
Metro (OUP, 1988)
Bridge Passages (OUP, 1991)
Blind Field (OUP September 1994)
Selected Poems (OUP, 1996)
The Red All Over Riddle Book (Faber, for children, 1997)
Portrait of my Father in an English Landscape (OUP, 1998)
The Budapest File (Bloodaxe, 2000)
An English Apocalypse (Bloodaxe, 2001)
A Modern Bestiary with artist Ana Maria Pacheco (Pratt Contemporary Art 2004)
Reel (Bloodaxe, 2004)
New and Collected Poems (Bloodaxe, 2008)
Shuck, Hick, Tiffey – Three libretti for children, with Ken Crandell (Gatehouse, 2008)
The Burning of the Books (Circle Press, 2008)
The Burning of the Books and Other Poems (Bloodaxe, 2009)
In the Land of the Giants – for children (Salt, 2012)
Bad Machine (Bloodaxe, 2013)
Bad Machine (Sheep Meadow, 2013, USA)
Mapping the Delta (Bloodaxe, 2016)
The Children (Paekakariki Press, 2018)

Selected poems in Hungarian, Chinese, Italian, German and Romanian

Memoir
The Photographer at Sixteen (MacLehose Press, 2019)

Translation
Imre Madách: The Tragedy of Man, verse play (Corvina / Puski 1989)
Sándor Csoóri: Barbarian Prayer. Selected Poems. (part translator, Corvina 1989)
István Vas: Through the Smoke. Selected Poems. (editor and part translator, Corvina, 1989)
Dezsö Kosztolányi: Anna Édes. Novel. (Quartet, 1991)
Ottó Orbán: The Blood of the Walsungs. Selected Poems. (editor and majority translator, Bloodaxe, 1993)
Zsuzsa Rakovszky: New Life. Selected Poems. (editor and translator, OUP March 1994)
The Colonnade of Teeth: Twentieth Century Hungarian Poetry (anthology, co-editor and translator, Bloodaxe 1996)
The Lost Rider: Hungarian Poetry 16–20th Century, an anthology, editor and chief translator (Corvina, 1998)
Gyula Krúdy: The Adventures of Sindbad short stories (CEUP, 1999)
László Krasznahorkai: The Melancholy of Resistance (Quartet, 1999)
The Night of Akhenaton: Selected Poems of Ágnes Nemes Nagy (editor-translator, Bloodaxe 2003)
Sándor Márai: Conversation in Bolzano (Knopf / Random House, 2004)
László Krasznahorkai: War and War (New Directions, 2005)
Sándor Márai: The Rebels (Knopf / Random House 2007; Vintage / Picador, 2008)
Ferenc Karinthy: Metropole (Telegram, 2008
Sándor Márai: Esther's Inheritance (Knopf / Random House, 2008)
Sándor Márai: Portraits of a Marriage (Knopf / Random House, 2011)
Yudit Kiss: The Summer My Father Died (Telegram, 2012)
László Krasznahorkai: Satantango (New Directions, 2012)
Magda Szabó: Iza's Ballad (Harvill Secker, 2014)

Poetry set to music
The Flight, set to music by Richard Causton (composer), as a commission for A Festival of Nine Lessons and Carols, at King's College, Cambridge.

As editor
The Collected Poems of Freda Downie (Bloodaxe 1995)
The Colonnade of Teeth: Modern Hungarian Poetry, co-edited with George Gömöri (Bloodaxe 1997)
New Writing 10, Anthology of new writing co-edited with Penelope Lively (Picador 2001)
An Island of Sound: Hungarian fiction and poetry at the point of change, co-edited with Miklós Vajda (Harvill 2004)
New Order: Hungarian Poets of the Post-1989 Generation (Arc 2010)
InTheir Own Words: Contemporary Poets on Their Poetry, co-edited with Helen Ivory (Salt, 2012)

Recordings
The Poetry Quartets 6, with Moniza Alvi, Michael Donaghy and Anne Stevenson (Bloodaxe / British Council 2001)
George Szirtes (Poetry Archive, 2006)

References

External links
George Szirtes' website 
George Szirtes Blog
Contemporary Writers
Writers Artists
Interview with John Tusa, BBC Radio 3
George Szirtes: what being bilingual means for my writing and identity (The Guardian, 3 May 2014)
George Szirtes T S Eliot Lecture, 2005
Article in Hungarian Quarterly
Article by Szirtes' on hidden Jewish roots in Habitus: A Diaspora Journal
George Szirtes at The Poetry Archive
Two Poems in Guernica Magazine

1948 births
Living people
British poets
Fellows of the Royal Society of Literature
Academics of the University of East Anglia
People from Wymondham
Hungarian emigrants to England
Hungarian–English translators
British male poets
T. S. Eliot Prize winners